Marj Al-Ghazal is a Palestinian village in the Jericho Governorate in the West Bank, located   north of Jericho.  According to the Palestinian Central Bureau of Statistics (PCBS), Marj Al-Ghazal had a population of 193 in the 2007 census.

Location
Nearby Palestinian localities include az-Zubaidat to the northeast, Al-Jiftlik to the south and west.

History
In the wake of the 1948 Arab–Israeli War, and after the 1949 Armistice Agreements, Marj al-Ghazal came under Jordanian rule. It was annexed by Jordan in 1950.

Since the Six-Day War in 1967, Marj al-Ghazal has been under Israeli occupation.

In 1970, Israel confiscated 509 dunum of village land in order to construct the Israeli settlement of Argaman.

After 1995 accords, 4% of Marj al-Ghazal's land was classified as Area B, the remaining 96% as Area C.

In the 2007 census Marj Al-Ghazal had a population of 193 with exactly 92 being males and 101 females. The total number of households was 43 who lived in 50 housing units.

References

External links
Marj al Ghazal Village (Fact Sheet),  Applied Research Institute - Jerusalem (ARIJ)
Marj al Ghazal Village Profile, ARIJ
Marj al Ghazal Aerial Photo, ARIJ
Locality Development Priorities and Needs in Marj al Ghazal, ARIJ

Jericho Governorate
Populated places established in 1995
Villages in the West Bank
Municipalities of the State of Palestine